Filip Johansson may refer to:
 Filip Johansson (ice hockey)
 Filip Johansson (footballer)